Minuscule 1424 (in the Gregory-Aland numbering), δ 30 (von Soden) is a Greek minuscule manuscript of the New Testament, written on 337 parchment leaves (28 by 18 cm). It has been dated paleographically to the 9th or 10th century).

Description 
The codex contains the entire New Testament with only one lacuna (Matthew 1:23-2:16). The books follow in this rather strange order: Gospels, Acts, Catholic epistles, Revelation of John, Pauline epistles. The text is written in one column per page, 29-33 lines per page.

There are marginal commentaries on the Gospels (Chrystostomos), Acts and Epistles; only the Book of Revelation lacks commentaries. The Eusebian Canons presented, added by a different, probably later, hand.

Text 
The Greek text of the codex, is a representative of the Byzantine text-type with alien readings. Streeter remarked some relations between the codex and the various "Caesarean" witnesses, especially in the Gospel of Mark, but conceded it is only a tertiary witness to the type. But there are more of the Alexandrian readings than Caesarean. The manuscript together with M (021), 7, 27, 71, 115, 160, 179, 185, 267, 349, 517, 659, 692, 827, 945, 954, 990, 1010, 1082, 1188, 1194, 1207, 1223, 1391, 1402, 1606, 1675, 2191 and other manuscripts belongs to the Family 1424 (von Soden's I φ group). The whole Family 1424 deserves a more textual study than it received.
According to Kurt and Barbara Aland in Gospel of Mark it agrees 88 times against the original text, 23 times supports the original text against the Byzantine, and 63 times it agrees with both. It has also 35 independent or distinctive readings. Alands placed the text of the codex in Category III for the Gospel of Mark, and in Category V for the rest of books.

According to the Claremont Profile Method it represents textual cluster 1675 in Luke 1, Luke 10, and Luke 20, as a diverging member.

 Textual variants
The word before the bracket is of UBS edition
 Matthew 11:2 – Χριστου ] Ιησου (supported by Codex Bezae, 0233, Lectionary 241 and other mss);
 John 12:5 – τριακοσιων ] διακοσιων;

History 
Currently it is dated by the INTF to the 9th or 10th century.

The codex was written by a monk named Sabas. Formerly it was held in the monastery Ikosifinissa in Drama.Greece). The codex was taken after the Balkan Wars of 1912-1913 from Ikosifinissa to western Europe. It was brought by Franklin Gruber to Chicago. Lake photographed the codex in 1902.

Until 2016 the codex was located in the Lutheran School of Theology at Chicago, as a part of the Gruber Collection (Gruber Ms. 152). In 2016, the LSTC decided to restitute it to the monastery.

See also 
 List of New Testament minuscules (1001-2000)
 Family 1424
 Textual criticism
 Biblical manuscript

References

Further reading 
 Burnett H. Streeter, "The Four Gospels" (London, 1924), p. 84. 
 Kenneth W. Clark, "A Descriptive Catalogue of Greek New Testament Manuscripts in North America". Chicago: The University of Chicago Press, 1937, pp. 104–106.

External links 

 Manuscript GA 1424 at the Center for the Study of New Testament Manuscripts.
 Minuscule 1424 at the Encyclopedia of Textual Criticism 
 Manuscript Gregory-Aland 1424 Internet Archive

Greek New Testament minuscules
9th-century biblical manuscripts